Tour of Mediterrennean is a stage road cycling race held annually in Turkey since 2018. It is part of UCI Europe Tour in category 2.2.

Winners

References

Cycle races  in Turkey
UCI Europe Tour races
Recurring sporting events established in 2018